Lewes & Rehoboth Hundred is a hundred in Sussex County, Delaware, United States. Lewes & Rehoboth Hundred was formed in 1692 as one of the original Delaware Hundreds. Its primary community is Lewes.

References

Hundreds in Sussex County, Delaware